Larry Ray Keller (born October 2, 1953) is a former American football linebacker who played three seasons with the New York Jets of the National Football League. He was drafted by the San Diego Chargers in the ninth round of the 1975 NFL Draft. He played college football at the University of Houston and attended Lutcher Stark High School in Orange, Texas.

References

External links
Just Sports Stats

Living people
1953 births
Players of American football from Texas
American football linebackers
Houston Cougars football players
New York Jets players
People from San Benito, Texas